was a Japanese Go player, who is said to be born in either Aizu or Kawachi Province. His year of birth is unknown, but his birthname is believed to be . He served as an apprentice to Yasui Shuntetsu Senkaku.

In 1748, he changed his birthname to his present name, and began playing castle game . As he was part of a famous Go house, he would play with the other Go houses in the shōgun's castle. In 1775, his mentor Yasui Shuntetsu Senkaku retired, causing him to become the sixth head of the Yasui house.

He died on September 4, 1780.

Results
1748 (Kan'en 1) 3 games/win vs Inoue Shunseki
1749 (Kan'en 2) 5 games/loss vs Honinbo Hakugen
1750 (Kan'en 3) 2 games/win vs Inoue Shunseki
1751 (Hōreki 1) none vs Inoue Shuntatsu
1752 (Hōreki 2) 1 game/loss vs Honinbo Hakugen
1753 (Hōreki 3) 2 games/loss vs Hayashi Tennyu
1754 (Hōreki 4) 4 games/win vs Inoue Shuntatsu
1755 (Hōreki 5) 2 games/win vs Hayashi Tennyu
1756 (Hōreki 6) 2 games/loss vs Inoue Shunseki
1757 (Hōreki 7) 6 games/win vs Inoue Shunseki
1758 (Hōreki 8) 2 games/loss vs Honinbo Satsugen
1759 (Hōreki 9) 5 games/loss vs Inoue Shuntatsu
1760 (Hōreki 10) 4 games/win vs Hayashi Yugen

Resources
木石庵「安井仙哲」

日本圍棋故事

References

Japanese Go players
1734 births
1780 deaths